Daniel Friberg (born 10 July 1986) is a Swedish speed skater. He competed in two events at the 2010 Winter Olympics.

References

External links
 

1986 births
Living people
Swedish male speed skaters
Olympic speed skaters of Sweden
Speed skaters at the 2010 Winter Olympics
People from Motala Municipality
Sportspeople from Östergötland County
21st-century Swedish people